Bernd Oberhoffner was an East German luger who competed in the early 1980s. He won the silver medal in the men's doubles event at the 1981 FIL World Luge Championships in Hammarstrand, Sweden.

Oberhoffner also won a gold medal in the men's doubles event at the 1979 FIL European Luge Championships in Oberhof, East Germany.

Oberhoffner also worked as a stuntman for winter sports, working on many films, including the ski sequences in the James Bond film For Your Eyes Only.

References

German male lugers
Possibly living people
Year of birth missing (living people)
20th-century German people